Dubai International Airport  is the primary international airport serving Dubai, United Arab Emirates, and is the world's busiest airport by international passenger traffic. It is also the nineteenth-busiest airport in the world by passenger traffic, one of the busiest cargo airports in the world, the busiest airport for Airbus A380 and Boeing 777 movements, and the airport with the highest average number of passengers per flight. In 2017, the airport handled 88 million passengers and 2.65 million tonnes of cargo and registered 409,493 aircraft movements.

Terminal 3 is the second-largest building in the world by floor space and the largest airport terminal in the world. In July 2019, Dubai International airport installed the largest solar energy system in the region's airports as part of Dubai's goal to reduce 30 percent of the city energy consumption by 2030.

Emirates Airline has its hub airport in Dubai International (DXB) and has their own terminal 3 with 3 concourses that they share with Flydubai. The Emirates hub is the largest airline hub in the Middle East; Emirates handles 51% of all passenger traffic and accounts for approximately 42% of all aircraft movements at the airport. Dubai Airport is also the base for low-cost carrier flydubai which handles 13% of passenger traffic and 25% of aircraft movements at DXB. The airport has a total capacity of 90 million passengers annually. As of January 2016, there are over 7,700 weekly flights operated by 140 airlines to over 270 destinations across all inhabited continents. Over 63% of travelers using the airport in 2018 were connecting passengers.

In 2014 Dubai International indirectly supported over 400,000 jobs and contributed over US$26.7 billion to the economy, which represented around 27% of Dubai's GDP and 21% of the employment in Dubai.

History
The history of civil aviation in Dubai started in July 1937 when an air agreement was signed for a flying boat base for the aircraft of Imperial Airways with the rental of the base at about 440 rupees per month – this included the guards' wages. The Empire Flying Boats also started operating once a week flying east to Karachi mostly direct from the UK and west to Southampton, England. By February 1938, there were four flying boats a week.

In the 1940s, flying from Dubai was by flying boats operated by British Overseas Airways Corporation (BOAC), operating the Horseshoe route from Southern Africa via the Persian Gulf to Sydney.

Construction

Construction of the airport was ordered by the ruler of Dubai, Sheikh Rashid bin Saeed Al Maktoum, in 1959. It officially opened in 1960 with its first airfield, at which time it was able to handle aircraft the size of a Douglas DC-3 on a  runway made of compacted sand. Three turning-areas, an apron and small terminal completed the airport that was constructed by Costain.

In May 1963, construction of a  asphalt runway started. This new runway, alongside the original sand runway and taxiway opened in May 1965, together with several new extensions were added to the Terminal Building, hangars erected, Airport and Navigational aids were installed. The installation of the lighting system continued after the official opening and was completed in August of that year. During the second half of the 1960s several extensions, equipment upgrades like a VHF omnidirectional range (VOR) and an instrument landing system (ILS), as well as new buildings, were constructed. By 1969, the airport was served by 9 airlines serving some 20 destinations.

The inauguration was on 15 May 1966 and was marked by the visits of the first big jets of Middle East Airlines and Kuwait Airways Comets.

The advent of wide-body aircraft required further airport development in the 1970s, which had already been foreseen by the Ruler of Dubai, and plans for a new Terminal, runways, and taxiways capable of coping with international flights were drawn up.
A new  control tower was also constructed.

This work made handling the Boeing 747 and Concorde possible. Several runway and apron extensions were carried out through the decade to meet growing demand.

1971 saw the new precision category 2 Approach and Runway Lighting System being commissioned. The construction of the Airport Fire Station and the installation of the generators were completed in December of that year and were fully operational in March 1972. The ruler also commissioned and inaugurated the Long-range Surveillance System on 19 June 1973.

With the expansion of the Airport Fire Services, it was necessary to find more suitable accommodation, and a hangar-style building was made available to them at the end of 1976. This was located midway between the runway ends to facilitate efficient operations. A new building was also constructed to house the Airport Maintenance Engineer, Electronics Engineering section, and Stores unit.

Expansion of the Airport Restaurant and Transit Lounge including the refurbishing of the upper level and the provision of a new kitchen was completed in December 1978.

The next phase of development was the second runway, which was completed three months ahead of schedule and opened in April 1984.

Also, several extensions and upgrades of terminal facilities and supporting systems were carried out. On 23 December 1980 the airport became an ordinary member of the Airports Council International (ACI). The decline of Karachi airport is often associated with the traffic Dubai took away from them. 

During the 1980s, Dubai was a stopping point for airlines such as Air India, Cathay Pacific, Singapore Airlines, Malaysia Airlines, and others traveling between Asia and Europe that needed a refueling point in the Persian Gulf. This use was later made redundant with the availability of Russian airspace due to the breakup of the Soviet Union and the advent of longer-range aircraft introduced in the late 1980s and early 1990s such as the Airbus A340, the Boeing 747-400 and the Boeing 777 series aircraft, which had the range to fly between Europe and Southeast Asia nonstop. British Airways flights from Islamabad to Manchester also stopped for short times during the 1980s.

Expansion

The opening of Terminal 2 in 1998 saw the first step of phase 1 of the new development master plan launched in 1997. As the second stage, Concourse 1 opened in April 2000 under the name of Sheikh Rashid Terminal. It also contains a hotel, business center, health club, exchanges, dining and entertainment facilities, internet services, medical center, post office, and a prayer room. The next step was the reconfiguration of the runways, already part of phase 2, and aprons and taxiways were expanded and strengthened in 2003–2004. In addition, the Dubai Flower Centre opened in 2005 as part of the development. The airport saw the need for this as the city is a hub for import and export of flowers and the airport required a specialist facility since flowers need special conditions.

Construction of Terminal 3 began in 2004 as the next stage of phase 2 of the development, with an estimated cost of around $4.55  billion. Completion was originally planned for 2006 but was delayed by two years.

On 30 May 2008, a topping out ceremony was conducted. The terminal became operational on 14 October 2008, with Emirates Airline (EK2926) from Jeddah, Saudi Arabia, being the first flight to arrive at the new terminal and EK843 to Doha, Qatar being the first departing flight. The terminal increased the airport's maximum passenger capacity annually by 47  million, bringing the total annual capacity up to 75 million passengers.

On 29 October 2010, the airport marked its 50th anniversary. The airport has seen over 402 million passengers at an average annual growth rate of 15.5% and handled over 3.87 million aircraft at an average annual growth rate of 12.4%.

With the arrival of the Airbus A380, the airport made modifications costing $230 million. These included the building of 29 gates capable of handling the large aircraft, five of which are in Terminal 3 and two are in Terminal 1. Other important projects at the airport include the next stage of phase 2 development, which includes the construction of Concourse 3. This will be a smaller version of Concourse 2, which is connected to Terminal 3.

Also as part of the expansion, the airport is now able to handle at least 75 million (an increase of 19 million) passengers per annum with the opening of Concourse 3, which is part of Terminal 3. However, recent communications predict a further increase to 80 million passengers with additional reassessments of existing capacities. In 2009, Terminal 2 expanded its facilities to handle 5 million (an increase of 2 million) passengers annually, taking the airport's total capacity to 62 million passengers. Terminal 2 capacity was planned to be expanded to bring the total capacity of the airport from the initial 75 million passengers to 80 million passenger capacity by 2012.

The Cargo Mega Terminal, which will have the capacity to handle 3 million tonnes of cargo a year, is a major development; it is going to be built in the long term. The completion of the mega terminal will be no later than 2018. Terminal 2 will be completely redeveloped to match the status of the other two terminals. With all of these projects completed by 2013, the airport expects to be able to handle at least 75–80 million passengers and over 5 million tonnes of cargo.

The airport's landside facilities were modified to allow the construction of two stations for the Red Line of Dubai Metro. One station was built at Terminal 1 and the other at Terminal 3. The line began service on 9 September 2009, and opened in phases over the next year. The second Metro line, the Green Line, runs near the Airport Free Zone and has served the airport's north-eastern area with the Terminal 2 starting in September 2011.

With phase 2 of DXB's expansion plan complete, the airport now has three terminals and three concourses, two cargo mega terminals, an airport free zone, an expo center with three large exhibition halls, a major aircraft maintenance hub and a flower center to handle perishable goods. A phase 3 which has been included in the master-plan involves the construction of a new Concourse 4.

The airport revealed its future plans in May 2011, which involve the construction of a new Concourse D for all airlines currently operating from concourse C. Concourse D is expected to bring the total capacity of the airport to over 90 million passengers and will open in early 2016. The plan also involves Emirates solely operating from Concourse C along with Concourse A and B.

In September 2012, Dubai Airports changed the names of concourses to make it easier for passengers to navigate the airport. Concourse 1, in which over 100 international airlines operate, became Concourse C. Concourse 2 became Concourse B and Concourse 3 became Concourse A. The gates in Terminal 2 were changed and are now numbered F1 to F6. The remaining alpha-numeric sequences are being reserved for future airport facilities that are part of the Dubai Airports' $7.8 billion expansion programme, including Concourse D.

Dubai's government announced the construction of a new airport in Jebel Ali, named Dubai World Central – Al Maktoum International Airport. It is expected to be the second-largest airport in the world by physical size, though not by passenger metrics. It opened 27 June 2010; however, construction is not expected to finish until 2027. The airport is expected to be able to accommodate up to 160 million passengers. There has been an official plan to build the Dubai Metro Purple Line to connect Al Maktoum International Airport to Dubai International Airport; construction was set to begin in 2012. The proposed  Purple Line will link Dubai International Airport and Al Maktoum International Airport.

Concourse D opened on 24 February 2016 for all international airlines and moved out of the Terminal 1. Emirates now operates from Concourses A, B and C, all under Terminal 3. while FlyDubai operates from Terminal 2 (Concourse F).

On 20 December 2018 the airport celebrated its one billionth passenger.

Air traffic

Main airlines based at DXB

 Emirates Airline is the largest airline operating at the airport, with an all-wide-body fleet of over 200 Airbus and Boeing aircraft based at Dubai, providing scheduled services to the Middle East, Africa, Asia, Europe, North America, South America, Australia and New Zealand. It operates out of Terminal 3, Concourses A, B and C.
 Emirates SkyCargo, a subsidiary of Emirates, operates scheduled all-cargo services between Dubai and the rest of the world.
 Flydubai, a low-cost airline planning to operate over 100 aircraft on scheduled passenger services to and from Dubai, to the Middle East, Africa, Europe and South Asia. It operates from Terminal 2 and, since December 2018, also from Terminal 3 for selected destinations.

Recreational flying to Dubai is catered for by the Dubai Aviation Club, which undertakes flying training for private pilots and provides facilities for private owners.

The Government of Dubai provides short and long range search and rescue services, police support, medical evacuation and general purpose flights for the airport and all VIP flights to the airport.

Statistics

Infrastructure

Dubai International Airport was conceptualized to function as Dubai's primary airport and the region's busiest for the foreseeable future without the need for relocation or the building of another airport when passenger figures increased. The area was chosen near to Dubai, to attract passengers from the city of Dubai, rather than travel to the busier Sharjah International Airport. The planned location originally was Jebel Ali.

The original master plan for the existing airport initially involved a dual-terminal and one runway configuration over two phases with provisions for another two passenger terminals in the near future. Phase 1 included the construction for the first passenger terminal, the first runway, 70 aircraft parking bays, support facilities and structures, including large maintenance hangar, the first fire station, workshops, and administrative offices, an airfreight complex, two cargo agents' buildings, in-flight catering kitchens and an  control tower. Construction for the second phase would commence immediately after the completion of Phase 1 and include the second runway, 50 new aircraft parking bays in addition to the existing 70 bays, a second fire station and a third cargo agent building.

The third phase included the construction of a new terminal (now the parts of Terminal 1's main building and Concourse C) and an additional 60 parking bays, as well as a new aircraft maintenance facility. Then, in the early 2000s (decade) a new master plan was introduced which began the development of the current concourses and terminal infrastructure.

Paul Griffiths (Dubai Airports' CEO) in his interview to Vision magazine, cited plans to build infrastructure to support the expansion of Emirates and budget airline flydubai, and ascend the ranks of global aviation hubs.

Control tower
The  airport traffic control tower (ATCT) was constructed as part of phase two of the then-development plan.

Terminals
Dubai International Airport has three terminals. Terminal 1 has one concourse (concourse D), Terminal 2 is set apart from the other two main buildings and Terminal 3 is divided into Concourse A, B, and C. The cargo terminal is capable of handling 3 million tonnes of cargo annually and a general aviation terminal (GAT) is close by.

Passenger terminals
Dubai Airport has three passenger terminals. Terminals 1 and 3 are directly connected with a common transit area, with airside passengers being able to move freely between the terminals without going through immigration, while Terminal 2 is on the opposite side of the airport. For transiting passengers, a shuttle service runs between the terminals, with a journey time of around 20 minutes from Terminal 2 to Terminal 1 and 30 minutes to Terminal 3. Passengers in Terminal 3 who need to transfer between concourse A and the rest of the Terminal have to travel via an automated people mover. Also after early 2016 when the construction of Concourse D was done, there is now an automated people mover between concourse D and Terminal 1.

Situated beside Terminal 2 is the Executive Flights Terminal, which has its own check-in facilities for premium passengers and where transportation to aircraft in any of the other terminals is by personal buggy.

The three passenger terminals have a total handling capacity of around 80  million passengers a year.

Terminals 1 and 3 cater to international passengers, whilst Terminal 2 is for budget passengers and passengers flying to the subcontinent and Persian Gulf region; Terminals 1 and 3 handle 85% of the passenger traffic and the Executive Flights terminal is for the higher-end travelers and important guests.

Terminal 1

Terminal 1 has a capacity of 45 million passengers. It is used by over 100 airlines and is connected to Concourse D by an automated people mover.

The Terminal was originally built to handle 18 million passengers; however, with extreme congestion at the terminal, the airport was forced to expand the terminal to accommodate the opening of 28 remote gates. Over the years, more mobile gates were added to the airport bringing the total as of 2010 to 28.

In 2013, Dubai Airports announced a major renovation for Terminal 1 and Concourse C. The renovations include upgraded baggage systems, replacement of check-in desks and a more spacious departure hall. Arrivals will also see improvements to help reduce waiting times. The renovation was completed by the middle of 2015.

Concourse D
Planning began for further expansion of Dubai Airport, with the construction of Terminal 4, it was revealed on the day Emirates completed its phased operations at the new Terminal 3, on 14 November 2008.
According to Dubai Airport officials, plans for Terminal 4 had begun and extensions would be made to Terminal 3. These are required to bring the capacity of the airport to 80–90 million passengers a year by 2015.

In May 2011, Paul Griffiths, chief executive of Dubai Airports revealed the Dubai Airport masterplan. It involves the construction of Concourse D (previously Terminal 4). With a capacity of 15 million, it would bring the total capacity of the airport to 90 million passengers by 2018—an increase of 15 million. It also will see Emirates take over the operation at Concourse C, along with concourse A and B which it will already be operating. All remaining airlines will shift to Concourse D, or move to Al Maktoum International Airport. The airport projects that international passenger and cargo traffic will increase at an average annual growth rate of 7.2% and 6.7%, respectively, and that by 2020 passenger numbers at Dubai International Airport will reach 98.5 million and cargo volumes will top 4.1 million tonnes.

Concourse D will have a capacity of 15 million passengers, include 17 gates and will be connected to Terminal 1 via an automated people mover. On 6 February 2016, members of the public were invited to trial the concourse in preparation for its opening. On Wednesday, 24 February 2016, Concourse D officially opened with the first British Airways flight arriving at gate D8.

Concourse D and Terminal 1 reopened on 24 June 2021 following a year's closure due to the COVID-19 pandemic.

Terminal 2

It is used by over 50 airlines, mainly operating in the Persian Gulf region. Most flights operate to India, Saudi Arabia, Iran, Afghanistan and Pakistan.

In June 2009, Terminal 2 became the hub of Air India Express and flydubai, and the terminal houses the airline's corporate head office.

Terminal 2 has undergone a major refurbishment recently, extending check-in and boarding facilities, changing the interior and exterior décor, and offering more dining choices to passengers. Capacity was increased to allow for 10 million passengers, an increase of 5 million.

The terminal has now increased the number of facilities available to passengers. Check-in counters have increased to 37. The boarding area is more spacious, with more natural light. Also the new open boarding gates allow several flights to board simultaneously, improving passenger and aircraft movements. There are a total of 43 remote stands at the terminal. However, passengers cannot move between Terminal 2 to 1 or from 2 to 3 and vice versa inside the airport. They have to make use of Taxi service or public transport available outside.

The  extension included a larger arrivals hall as well.

Terminal 3

The partly underground Terminal 3 was built at a cost of US$4.5 billion, exclusively for Emirates and has a capacity of 65 million passengers. The terminal has 20 Airbus A380 gates at Concourse A and 5 at Concourse B and 2 at Concourse C. It was announced on 6 September 2012 that Terminal 3 would no longer be Emirates-exclusive, as Emirates and Qantas had set up an extensive code sharing agreement. Qantas would be the second and only one of two airlines to fly in and out of Terminal 3. This deal also allows Qantas to use the A380 dedicated concourse.

A large part is located under the taxiway area and is directly connected to Concourse B: the departure and arrival halls in the new structure are  beneath the airport's apron. Concourse A is connected to the terminal via a Terminal 3 APM. It has been operational since 14 October 2008, and opened in four phases to avoid collapse of baggage handling and other IT systems.

The building includes a multi level underground structure, first and business class lounges, restaurants, 180 check-in counters and 2,600 car-parking spaces.

In arrivals, the terminal contains 72 immigration counters and 14 baggage carousels. The baggage handling system—the largest system and also the deepest in the world—has a capacity to handle 8,000 bags per hour.

Concourse A

Concourse A, part of Terminal 3, opened 2 January 2013, has a capacity of 19 million passengers and is connected to the two major public levels of Terminal 3 via Terminal 3 APM in addition to the vehicular and baggage handling system utility tunnels for further transfer. The concourse opened on 2 January 2013 and was built at a cost of US$3.3 billion. There are also 6 remote lounges for passengers departing on flights parked at 13 remote stands. The gates in concourse A are labelled A1–A24.

The concourse includes one 4-star hotel and one 5-star hotel, first- and business-class lounges, and duty-free areas. The concourse allows for multi-level boarding and boasts the largest first and business class lounges in the world. Each lounge has its own dedicated floor offering direct aircraft access from the lounges.

Concourse B

Concourse B is directly connected to terminal 3 and is dedicated exclusively to Emirates. The terminal has 10 floors (4 basements, a ground floor and 5 above floors). The building currently includes a multi-level structure for departures and arrivals and includes 32 gates, labelled B1–B32. The concourse has 26 air bridge gates and 5 boarding lounges for 14 remote stands that are for Airbus A340 and Boeing 777 aircraft only. For transit passengers the concourse has 3 transfer areas and 62 transfer desks.

The concourse also includes the Emirates first and Business class lounges, and the Marhaba lounge. The Marhaba lounge, the smallest lounge at the concourse has a capacity of 300 passengers at a time.

There are also three hotels in the concourse; a 5-star hotel and a 4-star hotel.

There is a direct connection to Sheikh Rashid Terminal (Concourse C) located at the control tower structure through passenger walkways. There is also a 300-room hotel and health club including both five and four star rooms. Concourse B includes five aerobridges that are capable of handling the new Airbus A380. Emirates Airline continues to maintain a presence in Concourse C, operating 12 gates at the concourse as well as the Emirates First Class and Business Class Lounges.

Concourse C
Concourse C, is a part of Terminal 3, was opened in 2000 and used to be the largest concourse at Dubai International Airport before Concourse B in Terminal 3 opened. It incorporates 50 gates, including 28 air bridges and 22 remote gates located at a lower level of the terminal. The gates are labelled C1–C50.

The concourse includes over 17 food and beverage cafes and restaurants, with the food court being located on the Departures Level. Also located in the concourse is a 5-star hotel and a  duty-free shopping facility. Other facilities include prayer rooms and a medical centre. Concourse C became part of Terminal 3 in 2016 after concourse D opened.

Al Majlis VIP Pavilion and Dubai Executive Flight Terminal

The Al Majlis VIP pavilion was exclusively built for the Dubai Royal Air Wing and opened on 1 July 2008. The entire facility is a  terminal, and includes a Royal Majlis and an antenna farm. In 2010 there were 47,213 customers, 13,162 movements and in 2009, there were a total of 43,968 customers and 14,896 movements.

Executive Flight Services (EFS) caters to those passengers of high class or special importance that travel through Dubai International Airports. It is the largest dedicated business aviation terminal of its kind in the Middle East. It is located at the Dubai Airport Free Zone close to Dubai International's Terminal 2. It only caters to private flights exclusive to the terminal. Airlines operating from the terminal are expected to maintain a lounge. In 2010, EFS handled 7,889 aircraft movements and 25,177 passengers.

The centre itself is located close to Terminal 2, and includes a  two-storey main building, a  hangar, a  ramp area for aircraft parking and a special VIP car park for long term parking. The centre also has its own immigration and customs sections, its own Dubai Duty Free outlet, a fully equipped business and conference centre, eight luxury private lounges and a limousine service between aircraft and the terminal.  The ramp area of the terminal can accommodate up to 22 small-sized private jets, between 8 and 12 medium-sized jets or up to four large-sized jets such as a Boeing Business Jet (BBJ), the Boeing 727 or the Airbus A319. The facility makes EFC the largest dedicated business aviation terminal in the Middle East.

Cargo Mega Terminal

The cargo village at Dubai International Airport is one of the world's largest and most central cargo hubs, with most of the cargo for Asia and Africa coming through the facility. Forecasts in 2004 for cargo growth predicted that additional major cargo handling facilities were needed to satisfy demands. Plans were put in place to construct the first stage of the cargo mega terminal, which by 2018 will have the ability to handle three million tons of freight.
Phase 1 of the cargo mega terminal was completed by 2004 and the next phase of expansion was scheduled for completion in late 2007. Presently the airport has a cargo capacity of 2.5 million tonnes, and will be expanded to handle 3 million.

Flower centre
Dubai Airport has constructed a flower centre to handle flower imports and exports, as Dubai is a major hub for the import and export of flowers, and the airport required a specialist facility since these products need special conditions. The flower centre's first phase was completed in 2004 at a cost of $50 million.

The centre when completed and functioning will have a floor area of approximately  including different export chambers and offices. The handling capacity of the centre is expected to be more than 300,000 tonnes of product throughput per annum. The entire facility (with the exception of the offices) will be maintained at an ambient temperature of just .

Runways

The runways are equipped with four sets of ILS to guide landing aircraft safely under very poor weather conditions. The runways were expanded to accommodate the Airbus A380 which came into service in 2007. In 2009, it was announced that the airport installed a Category III landing system, allowing planes to land in low-visibility conditions, such as fog. This system was the first of its kind in the United Arab Emirates.

In 2013 Dubai Airports announced an 80-day runway refurbishment program which started on 1 May 2014 and was completed on 21 July 2014. The northern runway was resurfaced while lighting upgrades and additional taxiways were built on the southern runway to help boost its capacity. The southern runway was closed from 1 to 31 May 2014, while the northern runway was closed from 31 May to 20 July 2014. Due to extra congestion on one runway, all freighter, charter and general aviation flights were diverted to Al Maktoum International Airport. Flights at DXB were reduced by 26% and 14 airlines moved to Al Maktoum International Airport whilst the runways works were being done. Emirates cut 5,000 flights and grounded over 20 aircraft during the period.

Dubai Airports plans to close the southern runway (12R/30L) for complete resurfacing and replacement of the airfield lighting and supporting infrastructure. This will be done during a 45-day period from 16 April 2019 to 30 May 2019. This upgrade will boost safety, service and capacity levels at DXB. Airlines will be required to reduce flight operations at DXB due to single runway operations.

Accommodating the Airbus A380
With Dubai-based Emirates being one of the launch customers for the Airbus A380 and also the largest customer, Dubai Airport needed to expand its existing facilities to accommodate the very large aircraft. The Department of Civil Aviation spent $120 million in upgrading both of its terminals and airport infrastructure, including enlarged gate holdrooms, new finger piers, an enlarged runway, new airbridges and extended baggage belt carousels from the normal . Dubai Airport also invested $3.5 billion into a new Concourse A, exclusively for handling Emirates A380s. With the changes made, the airport does not expect embarking and disembarking passengers and baggage from the A380 to take longer than it does for Boeing 747-400s, which carry fewer passengers. On 16 July 2008, Dubai Airport unveiled the first of two specially-built gates capable of handling the aircraft. Costing $10 million, the gates will enable passengers to get on the upper cabin of the new 555-seater aircraft directly from the gate hold rooms. The hold rooms themselves have been enlarged to cater for the larger number of passengers flying the A380s. In addition to the two gates at Terminal 1, five more A380-capable gates were opened at concourse B on 14 October 2008. Concourse A opened on 2 January 2013.

Labor controversy

Workers building a new terminal at Dubai International Airport went on a sympathy strike in March 2006. Another strike took place in October 2007. Four thousand strikers were arrested. Most of them were released some days later and those who were not local were then deported from Dubai.

Airlines and destinations

Passenger
The following airlines offer regular scheduled and charter services to and from the airport:

Notes
  Biman Bangladesh Airlines' flight from Dubai to Dhaka makes a stop at Sylhet. However, the flight from Dhaka to Dubai is non-stop.

Cargo

Services

Aviation services

Ground handling
Ground handling services at Dubai International Airport has been provided by Dnata Ground Handling Services.

Emirates Airlines has over 2000 Airport Services employees current serving the airport.

Services include cargo ramp and technical support services to airlines at Dubai Airport.

Aircraft maintenance
Emirates Engineering, based in Dubai, operates the aircraft maintenance and engine test cell technical facilities at the airport. Emirates Engineering currently provides full support for the Emirates Airline fleet and all the other international operations at the airport.

Current facilities include:
 Seven aircraft hangars all capable of handling the A380 (currently the largest aircraft hangar in the world)
 Aircraft painting hangar
 Aircraft processing plant
 Aircraft engine run-up facility enclosure
 Engineering Line Maintenance facility
 Engine Test Cell
 Aircraft spare parts stores

Passenger services
The  extension included a larger arrivals hall as well.

Extensive upgrading work on existing retail areas since 2004 in Terminals 1 and 2 has increased sales. Dubai Duty Free Company announced annual sales of Dhs5.9 billion (US$1.6 billion) in 2012, representing a 10 per cent increase on the previous year. Dubai Duty Free recorded more than 23.5 million transactions in 2012. As of August 2009, Dubai Duty Free was the biggest single airport retail operation in the world ahead of London's Heathrow and Seoul's Incheon airports.

In addition to a wide array of duty-free shops and eating outlets, Dubai Airport has two open-air garden areas. Dubai Airport has numerous business centres located around the airport. Within the international transit area of the interconnected Terminals 1 and 2, internet and games facilities, prayer rooms, showers, spas, gym, swimming pool and three hotels are provided. Various lounge areas are provided, some including children's play areas or televisions showing news, movies and sports channels. Terminal 3 has a left luggage facility operated by Emirates in the Arrivals area where layover passengers can leave their luggage for a fee while they go sightseeing.

Safety and security

The Civil Aviation Authority of Dubai manages the overall safety and security of the airport. Pre-screening takes place in all terminals at the entrance of the airport. Iris scanning has been implemented in all UAE airports. This type of scanning prevents those deported from the UAE for serious criminal charges from returning again using fraudulent documents.

The airport uses highly sensitive equipment to conduct thorough searches on travellers into the UAE, including screening for smuggling, possessing or taking illegal drugs in the country. A senior Dubai judge was quoted on 11 February 2008, by Seven Days saying, "These laws help discourage anyone from carrying or using drugs. Even if the amount of illegal drugs found on someone is 0.05 grams, they will be found guilty. The penalty is a minimum four years if it is for personal use. The message is clear—drugs will not be tolerated". A number of travellers have been held pending charge while Dubai authorities test their possessions, blood and urine for any trace of contraband.

In 2018, Houthi rebel group claimed that Dubai airport had been attacked by drones launched by Houthi rebels from Yemen. In response, Dubai Airports stated “With regards to reports by questionable sources this morning, Dubai Airports can confirm that Dubai International (DXB) is operating as normal without any interruption”.

Operations

Since there are international flights operating out from the airport, the terminals are equipped with immigration processing facilities and security scanning for all passengers including domestic, and regional passengers. Terminals 1 and 3 handle 95% of the international flights, whilst Terminal 2 mainly caters to regional flights and international flights routed to other airports in Middle East. Emirates Airline operates from only Terminal 3. Conversely, low-cost carriers such as flydubai operate flights out of Terminal 2.

Passenger growth at the airport has been growing at an average rate of 18%. The airport reached its capacity of 33 million passengers per annum by 2007; however, this was still not enough to handle the growing over congestion at the airport. In 2013, the airport's capacity reached 75 million with the opening of concourse A and expansion of Terminal 2.

Passenger traffic for 2014 grew by 7.5% as 70.48 million passengers passed through Dubai International, compared to 66.43 million during the corresponding period in 2013. Growth slowed down in 2014 due to the 80-day runway resurfacing project, which saw DXB operate with only one runway between May and July.

In 2014, India was DXB's biggest destination with 8.91 million passengers. The UK, Saudi Arabia and Pakistan followed with 5.38 million, 4.88 million and 3.13 million, respectively. London's Heathrow became the top city destination, recording 2,626,357 passengers. Doha followed it with 2,355,959. 

In 2020, Dubai International Airport's first quarter  passenger traffic fell down by 67.8 percent and reached 5.75 million. This is even lower than the statistics presented last year in the same quarter.

In 2022, Dubai International Airport registered strong recovery and robust growth in its customer base that propelled the annual passenger numbers to 66 million. The airport’s growth outpaced the annual forecast in the final months of the year following an exceptionally strong fourth quarter.

Cargo
The airport handled 2.37 million tonnes of air cargo in 2014, a decrease of 3.1 per cent over 2013, making it the sixth-busiest airfreight hub in the world and the busiest in the Middle East. The decline was due to the runway closure, and the shifting of many cargo flights from DXB to Al Maktoum International Airport.

Ground transportation

Road

The airport is connected by the road D 89. One of the longest intra-city roads, D 89 begins at the Deira Corniche and runs perpendicular to D 85 (Baniyas Road). From Deira, the road progresses south-eastward towards Dubai International Airport, intersecting with E 311 (Emirates Road) past the airport. A road tunnel underneath one of the runways was built in 2003.

Metro

The airport is served by Dubai Metro, which operates two lines through or near the airport. The Red Line has a station at each of Terminal 3 and Terminal 1. Services run between 6 am and 11 pm every day except Friday, when they run between 1 pm and midnight. These timings differ during the Islamic holy month of Ramadan. The stations are located in front of both terminals and can be accessed directly from the arrivals areas.

The Green Line has at a station near the Airport Free Zone, from which passengers can connect to Terminal 2.

The Purple and Blue Lines are under construction and these two lines will also have a station.

Bus
Dubai Buses operated by RTA run a number of routes to the city, but mainly Deira, and are available at the Airport Ground Transportation centre and the Arrivals at every terminal.

Passengers who need to transfer between Terminals 1 and 3, and Terminal 2 can use the inter-terminal shuttle bus service which operates frequently.

Bus stations are situated opposite both Terminal 1, 2 and 3. Local buses 4, 11, 15, 33 and 44 can be used to connect with Terminal 1 and 3, while bus 2 connects with Terminal 2. Dubai International Airport Buses provide air-conditioned transport into the city centre and over 80 hotels in the city.

Emirates offers a complimentary coach service, which operates three daily services to and from Al Ain, and four daily, to and from Abu Dhabi. So does Etihad.

Taxi
The airport is served by the Government owned Dubai Taxi Agency, which provides 24-hour service at the arrivals in every terminal.

Accidents and incidents
 On 14 March 1972, Sterling Airways Flight 296 crashed on approach to Dubai, killing 112.
 On 20 July 1973, Japan Air Lines Flight 404 was a passenger flight which was hijacked by Palestinian and Japanese terrorists. The flight was hijacked shortly after takeoff from Schiphol and made a stop in Dubai before flying to Damascus.
 On December 27, 1997, a Pakistan Airlines Boeing 747 plane from Karachi to London, crashed when landing at Dubai airport. It overshot the runway and went through the perimeter wall before coming to rest. No one was killed. 
 On 22 November 1974, British Airways Flight 870, a Vickers VC10, from Dubai to Heathrow, was hijacked in Dubai, landing at Tripoli for refuelling before flying on to Tunis. One hostage was murdered before the hijackers eventually surrendered after 84 hours. Captain Jim Futcher was awarded the Queen's Gallantry Medal, the Guild of Air Pilots and Air Navigators Founders Medal, the British Air Line Pilots Association Gold Medal and a Certificate of Commendation from British Airways for his actions during the hijacking, having returned to the aircraft to fly it knowing the hijackers were on board.
In 1999, Indian Airlines Flight 814 was hijacked over Indian airspace and tried to land at Dubai, after being prevented from landing in neighboring Oman. The airport authorities made sure that the plane could not land by stationing airport equipment and coaches on the runways. The plane later landed at a UAE military base.
 On 12 March 2007, the nose gear of Biman Bangladesh Airlines Flight BG006, an Airbus A310-300, collapsed while the aircraft was accelerating down the runway.
 On 3 September 2010, UPS Flight 6, operating a Boeing 747-44AF N571UP crashed due to an in-flight fire when attempting to return to Dubai. N571UP was operating an international cargo flight to Cologne Bonn Airport, Germany.
 On 3 August 2016, Emirates Flight 521 from Thiruvananthapuram International Airport, operating a Boeing 777-300 A6-EMW crashed upon landing. All 300 passengers and crew evacuated safely. However, one airport firefighter died battling the flames.
 On 19 December 2021, an Emirates Boeing 777-300ER A6-EQI performing Emirates flight 231 from Dubai to Washington Dulles International Airport took off and nearly crashed into nearby office or apartment buildings. It was discovered that there were problems with the autopilot.
 In February 2022, two Emirates planes nearly collided with each other. It seems that the pilots did not receive clearance from air traffic control.
 On 1 July 2022, a Brisbane bound Emirates Airbus A380 suffered some damage during take off. After it landed, airport workers found a big hole in the fuselage and some bolts in the landing gear. Investigations are still underway.

In media
In 2013, Dubai International Airport was featured in a 10-part documentary series called Ultimate Airport Dubai that aired on the National Geographic Channel and was produced by Arrow Media and National Geographic Channels International. The documentary focused on the everyday operations of the airport. The series returned for a second season in 2014 and a third in 2015.

See also
Al Maktoum International Airport – Dubai's second airport, located in Jebel Ali
Developments in Dubai
Tourism in Dubai
Transportation in Dubai

References

External links

Official website

 
Airports established in 1960
Airports in the United Arab Emirates
Buildings and structures in Dubai
Transport in Dubai
1960 establishments in the Trucial States